Thirudi is a 2006 Tamil language romance film directed by K. Shankar. The film stars newcomers Kathir and Dhanya Mary Varghese, with Sundar, Marina, Rajeev, Ponmaran, Gunasekhar, Kuyili, Vadivukkarasi, and Sempuli Jagan playing supporting roles. The film was produced by Mahadevan Ganesh and Usha Venkatramani. It had musical score by Bharani, cinematography by D. Shankar, and editing by S. Satish. The film released on 22 December 2006.

Plot

The film begins with Aravind (Kathir) waiting for someone and then starting to remember his love life.

Five years ago, the karateka Aravind, who hailed from Chennai, arrived in the village Valliyur to train karate under the guidance of the master Devaram (Rajeev). Devaram wanted his students to focus only on training, but Aravind's friend Ravi (Sundar) spent his time romancing with Thamarai's (Dhanya Mary Varghese) friend Poongavanam (Marina), and Devaram requested his students to not bring him a bad among the villagers. Ravi then turned against Devaram and started to practice Silambam with Devaram's archenemy Ponmaran (Ponmaran). In the meantime, Aravind and the village belle Thamarai fell in love with each other. Thereafter, Aravind left for Chennai. Before leaving, he promised Thamarai that he will come back to marry her. The local don Mani (Gunasekhar), Thamarai's relative, who was in love with Thamarai, wanted to marry her at any cost. The days passed, and Aravind did not return from Chennai. Thamarai's family then made marriage arrangements for her. Thamarai began to feel worried, and she fell sick both mentally and physically. When Aravind returned to Valliyur, he saw Thamarai in the hospital and challenged Mani to marry Thamarai. Thamarai then told Aravind that she will marry Mani, and she begged him to become a karate champion. During a fight between Aravind and Mani, Thamarai intervened to save Aravind and accidentally killed Mani.

Back to the present, Thamarai is released from jail and returns to her village. Ravi and Poongavanam are now a happily married couple. The film ends with the reunion of the lovers.

Cast

Kathir as Aravind
Dhanya Mary Varghese as Thamarai (Voice dubbed by Renuka)
Sundar as Ravi
Marina as Poongavanam
Rajeev as Devaram
Ponmaran as Ponmaran
Gunasekhar as Mani
Kuyili as Saroja, Thamarai's mother
Vadivukkarasi as Thamarai's aunt
Sempuli Jagan as Puli
Venkatesh
Hemanth

Production

S. T. Gunasekaran, a former associate of director Jeeva, made his directorial debut with the romantic film Thirudi. G. V. Films who had gone into the background, after the sudden death of G. Venkateswaran, made his return by producing the film. Newcomers Kathir and Dhanya were chosen to play the lead roles. The film was shot in villages including Valliyur, Tirunelveli and Nagercoil. D. Shankar took care of camera works while Bharani scored music for the film. The film director said, "Though the world has become so busy and commercialized these days, there is life, love and warmth still in rural areas. It is the crux of Thirudi".

Soundtrack

The film score and the soundtrack were composed by Bharani. The soundtrack, released in 2006, features 6 tracks with lyrics written by Na. Muthukumar. A critic stated, "The album has six tracks with a mix of fast rhythms and melodies. Though a few of them remind his earlier tunes, the songs in the album have catchy tunes and simple lyrics".

Reception
A critic said, "Thirudi, is a good entertainer sans violence and vulgarity, with a modern approach and catchy dialogue. Kathir and Tanya make a superb entry with this film. This romantic drama is packed with good humor and a clever screenplay".

References

2006 films
2000s Tamil-language films
Indian romance films
Films shot in Tirunelveli
2006 directorial debut films
2000s romance films